Remigijus Kriukas  (born 1961) is a Lithuanian painter.

References

See also
List of Lithuanian painters
Universal Lithuanian Encyclopedia

Lithuanian painters
1961 births
Living people